S.A.M. is a French 4-issue comics series created by Richard Marazano and Shang Xiao. It was first published by Dargaud.

Awards
 In 2012 - S.A.M. book 1 was awarded for best teenage album at the Angoulême International Comics Festival.
 In 2012 - S.A.M. book 1 was awarded for best youth album By "Union Nationnale Culture et Bibliothèque pour tous".

Story
In the near future, life has been almost eradicated form planet Earth. Only few groups of kids survive in the sewers of destroyed cities where they are hunted by killer robots.
Everything changes the day Yann, a teenage survivor, encounters S.A.M., a killer robot who saves his life instead of killing him. Yann then starts to believe that a special bond unites him with the giant robot.

French comics titles